Duality is a collaborative album by Lisa Gerrard and Pieter Bourke released in 1998. It was Lisa Gerrard's second post-Dead Can Dance album after The Mirror Pool from 1995. Lisa Gerrard and Brendan Perry released their last album in 1996 and had officially disbanded Dead Can Dance earlier in 1998.

At the ARIA Music Awards of 1998, the album was nominated for ARIA Award for Best World Music Album.

Overview
The beginning of the song "Shadow Magnet" influenced, in part, the music at the beginning of the Gladiator soundtrack (music by Hans Zimmer and Lisa Gerrard). The track "Nadir (Synchronicity)" was initially intended for use at the end of that film. However, due to copyright issues, a song 'influenced' by this track was used instead.

"Tempest" and "Sacrifice" were used for the Insider soundtrack.

Track listing
All tracks by Pieter Bourke and Lisa Gerrard except where noted.

References

External links 
 Lisa Gerrard's album page
 Duality at Amazon.com
 Duality at Dead-Can-Dance.com

1998 albums
Lisa Gerrard albums
4AD albums
Collaborative albums